Lew Evans (born 14 October 1927) is a former  Australian rules footballer who played with Hawthorn in the Victorian Football League (VFL).

Notes

External links 

Living people
1927 births
Australian rules footballers from Victoria (Australia)
Hawthorn Football Club players